Camporese is an Italian surname. Notable people with the surname include:

 Michele Camporese, (born 1992), Italian footballer
 Omar Camporese, Italian tennis player
 Pietro Camporese the Elder, Italian architect
 Pietro Camporese the Younger, Italian architect

References 

Italian-language surnames